The 1955 Yugoslav Cup was the 9th season of the top football knockout competition in SFR Yugoslavia, the Yugoslav Cup, also known as the "Marshal Tito Cup" (Kup Maršala Tita), since its establishment in 1946.

Round of 16
In the following tables winning teams are marked in bold; teams from outside top level are marked in italic script.

Quarter-finals

Semi-finals

Final

See also
1955–56 Yugoslav First League
1955–56 Yugoslav Second League

External links
1955 Yugoslav Cup details at Rec.Sport.Soccer Statistics Foundation

1955
Cup